Tacachi Municipality is the fourth municipal section of the Punata Province in the Cochabamba Department in Bolivia. Its seat is Tacachi.

Cantons 
The municipality consists of only one canton, Tacachi Canton. It is identical to the municipality.

Languages 
The languages spoken in the Tacachi Municipality are mainly Quechua and Spanish.

See also 
 K'illi K'illi

References 

  Instituto Nacional de Estadistica de Bolivia  (INE)

External links 
 Population data and map of Tacachi Municipality

Municipalities of the Cochabamba Department